The 1941 Brighton by-election was held on 15 November 1941.  The by-election was held due to the resignation of the incumbent Conservative MP, Lord Erskine.  It was won by the Conservative candidate Anthony Marlowe, who was unopposed.

References

1941 elections in the United Kingdom
1941 in England
20th century in Sussex
Politics of Brighton and Hove
By-elections to the Parliament of the United Kingdom in East Sussex constituencies
Unopposed by-elections to the Parliament of the United Kingdom (need citation)
November 1941 events